The 2020 Ligier European Series was the first season of the Ligier European Series. The five-event season began at Circuit Paul Ricard on 18 July and finished at Algarve International Circuit on 31 October.

Calendar

Entries

Teams and drivers

Results
Bold indicates overall winner.

Championships

JS P4 Drivers

JS2 R Drivers

JS P4 Teams

JS2 R Teams

References

External links
 

2020 in motorsport
Sports car racing series